Quercus ilex, the evergreen oak, holly oak or holm oak is a large evergreen oak native to the Mediterranean region. It is a member of the Ilex section of the genus, with acorns that mature in a single summer.

Description
The young shoots are clothed with a close gray felt. The fruits are produced one to three together on a short downy stalk, ripening the first season; the acorns usually 12–18 mm long in the UK, the cups with appressed, downy scales.

Taxonomy 
The resemblance of the foliage to that of the common European holly, Ilex aquifolium, has led to its common and botanic names. The name  was originally the classical Latin name for the holm oak, but later adopted as a botanical genus name for the hollies. Quercus ilex is placed in section Ilex.

Quercus rotundifolia was previously thought to be part of this species, but was later moved to its own. Some authors still describe Quercus rotundifolia as a subspecies of Quercus ilex.

The common name 'holm oak' takes its name from holm, an ancient name for holly.

Distribution and habitat 
Holm oak grows in pure stands or mixed forest in the Mediterranean and often at low or moderate elevations.

Quercus ilex is prevalent from Greece to certain parts of the Iberian Peninsula, where it mixes with Q. rotundifolia, along the northern Mediterranean coastal belt.

Ecology 
Holm oak is listed as an invasive species in the United Kingdom. Normally the tree is unable to withstand severe frost, which would prevent it from spreading north, but with climate change, it has successfully penetrated and established itself in areas north of its native range. The largest population of Holm oak in Northern Europe is present on and around St. Boniface Down on the Isle of Wight and into the neighbouring town of Ventnor, a town known for its naturally warmer microclimate, and has shown to tolerate the high winds on the downs. It is thought that this population's propagation (which was established in the late 1800s after having been planted by Victorian residents) has been bolstered by native Eurasian jays (Garrulus glandarius), which harvest acorns from oak trees and store them by burying them in the ground where they may then germinate. Feral goats were brought to Ventnor to control the spread of the Holm oak.

Cultivation and uses
The wood is hard and tough, and has been used since ancient times for general construction purposes as pillars, tools, wagons (as mentioned in Hesiod, Works and Days on page 429), vessels and wine casks. It is also used as firewood and in charcoal manufacture.

The holm oak is one of the top three trees used in the establishment of truffle orchards, or truffières. Truffles grow in an ectomycorrhizal association with the tree's roots.

Q. ilex can be clipped to form a tall hedge, and it is suitable for coastal windbreaks, in any well drained soil. It forms a picturesque rounded head, with pendulous low-hanging branches. Its size and solid evergreen character gives it an imposing architectural presence that makes it valuable in many urban and garden settings. While holm oak can be grown in much of maritime northwestern Europe, it is not tolerant of cold continental winters. It is a parent of Quercus × turneri, along with Quercus robur.

The first trees to be grown from acorns in England are still to be found within the stately grounds of Mamhead Park, Devon. From Britton & Brayley in The Beauties of England and Wales (1803):The woods and plantations of Mamhead are numerous and extensive. Many of them were introduced by Mr Thomas Balle (sic), the last of that family who, on returning from the continent brought with him a quantity of cork, ilex, wainscot, oak; Spanish chestnut, acacia, and other species of exotic trees.

Notable trees
The Tree Register Champion in Gloucestershire measured 8.95 m in circumference and 12 m in height in 1993. Another tree at Courtown House, Wexford, Ireland, reputedly planted in 1648, measured 20 m in height, with a spread of 43 m in 2010. An ancient tree reputed to be 500 years old at Fulham Palace, London is listed as one of the Great Trees of London.

The oldest holm oak in Spain, the Encina Tres Patas de Mendaza, located in Navarre, is reputed to be 1,200 years old. A specimen in Milo, in Sicily, is reputed to be 700 years old while a small population on the slopes of northern village of Wardija in Malta are said to be between 500 and 1,000 years old. Prior to the Carthaginian period, holm oak was prevalent on the islands.

The Roman poet Horace predicted that the ilex growing on his farm would become famous when he included it in his hymn to the Spring of Bandusia there (Odes 3.13.12–16):
fies nobilium tu quoque fontium,
me dicente cavis impositam ilicem
saxis, unde loquaces
lymphae desiliunt tuae.

(You will become one of the famous springs, too,
Now that I am telling of the ilex planted over your stone
Hollows, where your babbling
Waters leap down.)

References

Sources
BBC News (2008) Holm Oak: Garden Invader
Royal Botanic Garden (2008) Flora Europaea: Quercus ilex
W.J. Bean (1976) Trees and shrubs hardy in the British Isles 8th ed., revised. John Murray.
C. Michael Hogan (2008) Barbary Macaque: Macaca sylvanus, Globaltwitcher.com, ed. N. Strõmberg
Holm Oak (2002) 
K. Rushforth (1999) Trees of Britain and Europe. HarperCollins .
Chênes: Quercus ilex

External links
 Quercus ilex - information, genetic conservation units and related resources. European Forest Genetic Resources Programme (EUFORGEN)

ilex
Flora of Spain
Flora of Malta
Flora of the Pyrenees
Flora of France
Ornamental trees
Drought-tolerant trees
Trees of Europe
Trees of Mediterranean climate
Garden plants of Europe
Plants described in 1753
Taxa named by Carl Linnaeus
Flora of the Mediterranean Basin